Ravindranath Droopad is an electrical engineer at Texas State University in San Marcos, Texas. He was named a Fellow of the Institute of Electrical and Electronics Engineers (IEEE) in 2016 for his contributions to epitaxial growth of advanced materials for RF and CMOS applications.

References 

Fellow Members of the IEEE
Living people
Year of birth missing (living people)
American electrical engineers